Glucan 1,6-alpha-glucosidase (exo-1,6-beta-glucosidase, glucodextrinase, glucan alpha-1,6-D-glucohydrolase) is an enzyme with systematic name glucan 6-alpha-D-glucohydrolase. This enzyme catalyses the following chemical reaction:

 Hydrolysis of (1->6)-alpha-D-glucosidic linkages in (1->6)-alpha-D-glucans and derived oligosaccharides

Hydrolysis is accompanied by inversion at C-1.

References

External links 
 

EC 3.2.1